The 1949–50 New York Knicks season was the fourth season for the team in the National Basketball Association (NBA). In the regular season, the Knicks finished in second place in the Eastern Division, posting a 40–28 record and advancing to the NBA Playoffs. New York won its first round series against the Washington Capitols, 2–0, to make it to the Eastern Division Finals. There, the team was defeated two games to one by the Syracuse Nationals.

NBA Draft

Roster
{| class="toccolours" style="font-size: 95%; width: 100%;"|}
|-
! colspan="2" style="background-color: #1560BE;  color: #FFFFFF; text-align: center;" | New York Knicks 1949–50 roster
|- style="background-color: #FF7518; color: #FFFFFF;   text-align: center;"
! Players !! Coaches
|- 
| valign="top" |
{| class="sortable" style="background:transparent; margin:0px; width:100%;"|}
! Pos. !! # !! Nat. !! Name !! Ht. !! Wt. !! From
|-

Regular season

Season standings

Record vs. opponents

Game log

Playoffs

|- align="center" bgcolor="#ccffcc"
| 1
| March 21
| @ Washington
| W 90–87
| Carl Braun (26)
| Carl Braun (6)
| Uline Arena
| 1–0
|- align="center" bgcolor="#ccffcc"
| 2
| March 22
| Washington
| W 103–83
| Harry Gallatin (20)
| Dick McGuire (6)
| Madison Square Garden III
| 2–0
|-

|- align="center" bgcolor="#ffcccc" 
| 1
| March 26
| @ Syracuse
| L 83–91 (OT)
| Carl Braun (22)
| Carl Braun (4)
| State Fair Coliseum
| 0–1
|- align="center" bgcolor="#ccffcc" 
| 2
| March 30
| Syracuse
| W 80–76
| Vince Boryla (21)
| Dick McGuire (7)
| Madison Square Garden III
| 1–1
|- align="center" bgcolor="#ffcccc" 
| 3
| April 2
| @ Syracuse
| L 80–91
| Gallatin, Vandeweghe (17)
| Dick McGuire (5)
| State Fair Coliseum
| 1–2
|-

References

New York Knicks seasons
New York
New York Knicks
New York Knicks
1940s in Manhattan
1950s in Manhattan
Madison Square Garden